Mis amigos de siempre is an Argentine telenovela that it was issued from December 3, 2013 to August 8, 2014 during the schedule of Monday through Friday at 9:00 p.m. by Canal 13. It is produced by Pol-ka, owned by Adrián Suar, Artear and Fernando Blanco.

Plot 
The series tells the story of three friends called, Simón, Julián and Manuel. A friendship that was born when they were 8 years old while playing in a successful children's soccer team that represented a neighborhood club. When they were around 30 and around a decade without seeing each other, they met again in the same club, which is overwhelmed by debts. Julián (Gonzalo Heredia) son of Inés (Soledad Silveyra), is a professional player who plays in a football team abroad. He is very womanizing, and when he returns to Buenos Aires, Argentina he will fall in love with Bárbara (Emilia Attias), an accountant who also integrates the club's women's soccer team, where Julián will officiate as technical director. Until that time she thought to marry Luciano (Federico Amador), who along with his brother Maxi (Benjamín Rojas), are the owners of a logistics transport company, but Julián's arrival will change everything. Manuel (Nicolás Vázquez) He is a lonely bar owner of nostalgic personality, he longs for the old times of his youth. He will have an affair with Leo (Manuela Pal), also a female soccer team player. Simón (Nicolás Cabré) He works doing deals in the company of Luciano and Maxi. He is in crisis with his wife Rocío (Agustina Cherri) and in addition, he will begin to be attracted to Tania (Calu Rivero), who is DJ and cousin of Bárbara. Simón is distanced from his father, Cholo Alarcón (Osvaldo Laport), who returns to Buenos Aires, Argentina and begins to work as Colectivero of Buenos Aires, but also returns with his other son Guido (Victorio D´Alessandro), whom Simón sees with some suspicion. The treasurer of the indebted club, Andrea (Claribel Medina), cannot face the creditors, who demand that if the debt is not paid off, they will strip the entity of its facilities. There is a possibility to avoid it, winning a tournament that gives the champion team club an important economic prize, thanks to the auspices of a leading company. Meanwhile, the trio of friends will try to rebuild their friendship.

Production
Pol-ka had a difficult year in 2012, as most of its productions had poor ratings against Graduados, the telenovela from the rival channel Telefe. Their 2013 productions had a better reception, and Solamente Vos and Farsantes got the highest ratings. Mis amigos de siempre, the production for the 2014 season, includes several actors who had not worked in Argentine television  for some time, such as the senior actors Soledad Silveyra and Osvaldo Laport.

The production includes similarities with Campeones de la vida, an older telenovela by Pol-Ka. The plot is focused on a sports club and many characters are sportspeople. Silveyra and Laport play a couple once more. The plots try to avoid the usual cliches in the romantic couples of telenovelas. The plots are also focused on nostalgia, but not as pronounced as in Graduados. The opening theme was performed by the band Tan Biónica, who had also made the opening theme of Graduados.

Reception
The first episode was aired on December 3, 2013. It got 18.1 rating points.

Cast 
 Agustina Cherri as Rocío Monti
 Nicolás Cabré as Simón Alarcón
 Gonzalo Heredia as Julián Ruiz
 Nicolás Vázquez as Manuel Pellegrini
 Emilia Attias as Bárbara Delgado
 Calu Rivero as Tania Delgado
 Osvaldo Laport as Domingo "Cholo" Alarcón
 Soledad Silveyra as Inés de Ruiz
 Benjamín Rojas as Máximo Barraco
 Martin Seefeld as Oscar Pires
 Claribel Medina as Andrea
 Felipe Colombo as Fidel
 Leticia Brédice as Carolina 
 Gustavo Conti as Fabián
 Michel Noher as José María
 Nicolás Pauls as León
 Esteban Pérez as Mariano
 Manuela Pal as Leonora "Leo" Barceló
 Federico Amador as Luciano Barraco
 Ana María Colombo as Alicia Barraco
 Victorio D´Alessandro as Guido Alarcón
 Juana Viale as Delfina Correa
 Florencia Raggi as Natalia/Clara Aguirre
 Joaquín Flamini as Aquiles Suárez
 Natalia Carabetta as Zoe Alarcón
 Leonora Balcarce as Josefina
 Leticia Siciliani as Sol
 Agustina Attias as Agustina
 Belén Persello as Ruth
 Francisco Fernández de Rosa as Patricio
 Nicolás Mele as Germán
 Maia Dosoretz as Maia
 Miguel Jordan as Higilio
 Ana Moreno as Ana
 Jimena Riestra as Ilondra
 María Ibarreta as Thelma
 Sol Madrigal as Mara
 Nicolás Goldschmidt as Ezequiel
 Gastón Ricaud as Nico
 Martín Orecchio as Tomás
 Alejandro Paker as Álvaro
 Mariana Richaudeau as Marisa
 Paolo Ragone as Bruno
 Sofía Elliot as Cecilia
 Diego Treu as Charly
 Malena Narvay as Sofía
 Juano Tabares as Ale
 Diego Pérez as Fernando "Yayo"
 Sebastián Almada as Ricardo "Queco"
 Anderson Ballesteros as Montoya
 Juan Palomino as Suárez
 Carlos Nieto as García
 Noemí Morelli as Professor Martinelli
 Germán Tripel as Bomba
 Daniela Lopilato as Bebu
 Javier de la Torre as Cato
 Germán Rodríguez as Natalia's ex boyfriend

Awards

Nominations
 2014 Martín Fierro Awards
 Best comedy
 Best actor of daily comedy (Nicolás Cabré)
 Best actor of daily comedy (Osvaldo Laport)
 Best actress of daily comedy (Agustina Cherri)
 Best actress of daily comedy (Calu Rivero)
 Best actress of daily comedy (Soledad Silveyra)
 2014 Kids Choice Awards Argentina
 Favorite local program 
 Favorite actor (Nicolás Vázquez)
 Favorite actress (Emilia Attías)
 Favorite supporting actress (Manuela Pal)

References

External links
 Official site 

2010s Argentine television series
2013 telenovelas
Pol-ka telenovelas
2013 Argentine television series debuts
2014 Argentine television series endings
Sports fiction